Chuwut Murk is a populated place situated in Pima County, Arizona, United States.

References

Populated places in Pima County, Arizona